The Hope Whisper was an electric car developed in Denmark in 1983.  The sole model crashed at the unveiling when the car rolled away during the photoshoot and hit a barrier. It did not reach production.

The Whisper was a compact four-seater city car (two adults and two children), with a claimed range of 62 miles and a top speed of 50 mph.

In 1985, a Whisper II was developed with Berlin University but funding for production was again not forthcoming.

References

Electric concept cars